"Hoy Me He Vuelto a Enamorar" ("I Have Fallen in Love Again") is a song written by Jorge Luis Piloto and performed by American salsa singer Frankie Negrón on his debut studio album Con Amor Se Gana (1997). It was released as the second single from the album. Piloto specifically wrote the song for Negrón. In the song, the singer gets over his former lover by finding a new love interest. It became his second #1 hit on the Tropical Airplay chart. On the review of the album, the Newsday critic Richard Torres praised Negrón for being able to "convey the drama" on the track. Similarly, Alisa Valdes of the Boston Globe noted that the artist "seizes upon traditional montuno sounds to relax his reserve, and belts out some nice licks." The track was recognized as one of the best-performing songs of the year on the Tropical/salsa field at the 1998 ASCAP Latin Awards.

Charts

Weekly charts

Year-end charts

See also
List of Billboard Tropical Airplay number ones of 1997

References

1997 songs
1997 singles
Frankie Negrón songs
Warner Music Latina singles
Spanish-language songs